The 2019 Euro Beach Soccer League (EBSL) was the 22nd edition of the Euro Beach Soccer League, the annual, premier competition in European beach soccer contested between men's national teams. It was organised by Beach Soccer Worldwide (BSWW), in a league and play-off format.

This season, the competing teams continued to take part in two divisions: the top tier (Division A) and the bottom tier (Division B). 12 teams continued to contest Division A; all twelve teams returned from last season's top tier as none were relegated. Division B accommodated a record 16 nations: 14 nations who did not gain promotion from last season, Finland who made their debut, and the Netherlands who returned after an absence from competing in recent years.

Due to the saturated 2019 international beach soccer calendar for European teams, this season was shortened considerably compared to the usual program. A total of just two stages of fixtures were scheduled during the regular season. Each team from Division A played in just one stage (compared to the usual two) whilst each team in Division B also played in one. At each stage the participating nations earned points for the overall league tables.

At the end of the regular season, according to the league tables, the eight best teams in Division A advanced to the post-season event, the Superfinal, to compete to become the winners of this year's EBSL. Meanwhile, the top seven teams in Division B (the four group winners and three best runners-up) and the team ranked bottom of Division A played in a different post-season event, the Promotion Final, to try to earn a spot in Division A next year.

Azerbaijan, the defending Division A team in the Promotion Final, beat Kazakhstan in the final to win the event, therefore retaining their Division A status for next season; for the second year running, no Division B nation earned promotion. Italy were the defending champions but were knocked out of title-winning contention in the group stage of the Superfinal, ultimately finishing fourth in the post-season event. The concluding match of the Superfinal was contested between Russia and Portugal, who were both looking to claim a record sixth European title. Portugal, on home sand, came from 2–0 down to win the match and claim their sixth EBSL crown.

Calendar and locations 
The calendar below was revealed on 18 March 2019.

Similarly to the 2008 and 2015 editions, this season's regular season schedule was truncated, down to just two stages, in order to accommodate the additional events taking up space in the international calendar, including Division A teams competing in just one stage each, compared to the usual two stages.

Teams

The following 28 teams entered this season, divided into divisions A and B as shown (12 in Division A, 16 in Division B).

The numbers in parentheses show the European ranking of each team prior to the start of the season, out of 36 nations.

Division A

  (1st)
  (2nd)
  (3rd)
  (4th)
  (5th)
  (6th)

  (7th)
  (8th)
  (9th)
  (10th)
  (12th)
  (15th)

Division B

  (11th)
  (13th)
  (14th)
  (16th)
  (17th)
  (18th)
  (19th)
  (20th)

  (21st)
  (22nd)
  (23rd)
  (24th)
  (25th)
  (26th)
  (28th)
 1 (n/a)

Notes:
1. Teams making their debut

Stage 1 (Nazaré, 5–7 July)

Matches are listed as local time in Nazaré, WEST (UTC+1)

All matches took place at the Estádio do Viveiro on Praia de Nazaré (Nazaré Beach), in tandem with the hosting of the 2019 Women's Euro Beach Soccer Cup. The area has a capacity of 2,200.

During this round, Georgia won their first ever matches in the EBSL, ultimately leading to a first stage title (in either division), meanwhile Spain reached a milestone of winning their 25th stage title. Goalkeeper Valentin Jaeggy made his 300th appearance for Switzerland on day 3, marked with a commemorative jersey presented on-field by fellow players.

Division A

Group 1

Group 2

Division B

Awards
The following were presented after the conclusion of the final day's matches. Individual awards apply to Division A only.

Stage 2 (Catania, 16–18 August)
Matches are listed as local time in Catania, CEST (UTC+2)

All matches took place at the Arena Beach Stadium on the "Spiaggia libera numero 1" (Free beach number 1) section of Playa di Catania (Catania Beach), with a capacity of approximately 2,000.

Finland made their EBSL debut during this stage.

Division A

Division B

Group 1

Serbia withdrew on 16 August due to administrative issues; their opponents received 3–0 walkover wins.

Group 2

Group 3

Awards
The following were presented after the conclusion of the final day's matches. Individual awards apply to Division A only.

League tables
At end of regular season

Ranking & tie-breaking criteria: Division A – 1. Points earned 2. Highest group placement 3. Goal difference 4. Goals scored / Division B – 1. Highest group placement 2. Points earned 3. Goal difference 4. Goals scored 5. Least yellow cards

Division A

Division B
Key:
Team group placement:  1st place /  2nd place /  3rd place /  4th place(Q) – Qualified to Promotion Final as a group winner(q) – Qualified to Promotion Final as a best group runner-up
a. Norway received fewer yellow cards (0) than England (2).

Promotion Final (Figueira da Foz, 5–8 September)
Matches are listed as local time in Figueira da Foz, WEST (UTC+1).

All matches took place at a purpose built stadium constructed between 12 August and 3 September at the Beach Sports Complex on Praia de Buarcos (Buarcos Beach), with a capacity of 2,500.

The top seven teams from Division B and the team bottom of Division A, as per the end of regular season league tables, played in the Promotion Final; the winner earned a place in Division A in the 2020 season.

Qualified teams
The teams in bold qualified as Division B regular season group winners; those in italics qualified as the three best group runners-up.

The team in  attempted to retain their position in Division A, having finished bottom of the regular season table.

 
 

1

 
 
  2
3 (Last place, Division A)

Notes:
1. First appearance in Promotion Final
2. Bulgaria withdrew due to administrative issues on 2 September; they were replaced by the next best team in the Division B table, Estonia.
3. First appearance as defending Division A team in Promotion Final

Group stage

Group 1

Group 2

Kazakhstan, Greece & Hungary are ranked based on their head-to-head results. (GD: Kaz +3; Gre +1; Hun –4)

Play-off stage

Seventh place play-off

Fifth place play-off

Third place play-off

Promotion play-off final

Final standings
Azerbaijan won the event to successfully retain their Division A status for the 2020 EBSL season; this was the first time since the Promotion Final was introduced in 2009 that the defending Division A team successfully won the event in consecutive seasons (following Germany's successful defence of their top tier membership in 2018).

Consequently, no Division B team earned promotion to the top division and no Division A team was relegated this year.

Superfinal (Figueira da Foz, 5–8 September)

Matches are listed as local time in Figueira da Foz, WEST (UTC+1).

All matches took place at a purpose built stadium constructed between 12 August and 3 September at the Beach Sports Complex on Praia de Buarcos (Buarcos Beach), with a capacity of 2,500.

The winners of the Superfinal are crowned 2019 EBSL champions. No teams made their debut in the Superfinal, however Turkey made their first appearance in 17 years.

Qualified teams
The top eight teams from Division A, as per the end of regular season league table, qualified for the Superfinal.

 
 (hosts)

Group stage

Group 1

Group 2

Play-off stage

Seventh place play-off

Fifth place play-off

Third place play-off

Superfinal match

Awards

Winners trophy

Individual awards
Awarded for feats achieved in the Superfinal only

Final standings
Finalists Russia and Portugal faced each other for a record fourth time in an EBSL title-decider (no fixture has been played more in the Sueprfinal match), with Russia having won all three previous meetings (2009, 2013, 2017); both teams were aiming to win a record sixth EBSL title, surpassing the current five title record shared with Spain who first reached the milestone in 2006.

Season statistics (Division A)

Top scorers
The following tables list the top 12 scorers in Division A, including goals scored in both the regular and post season events.

Source

Most assists
The following tables list the top 10 assistants in Division A including assists provided in both the regular and post season events.

Source

Discipline
The following table lists the players and teams who received the most penalties for disciplinary infringements in both the regular and post season events.

Source

References

External links
 Beach Soccer Worldwide (BSWW), official website
 Stage 1, Nazaré 
 Stage 2, Catania 
 Superfinal and Promotion Final, Figueira da Foz 
 Beach Soccer Russia, official website (in Russian)

 Division A, Stage 1
 Division A, Stage 2
 Superfinal
 Division B, Stage 1
 Division B, Stage 2
 Promotion Final

Euro Beach Soccer League
Euro Beach Soccer League
Euro Beach Soccer League
Euro Beach Soccer League
Euro Beach Soccer League
Euro Beach Soccer League
Euro Beach Soccer League